Morrow Mountain may refer to: 

Morrow Mountain State Park, which includes a peak in Stanly County, North Carolina
Morrow Mountain (New York), a peak in Madison County, New York
Jesse Morrow Mountain, a peak in Fresno County, California